The six-banded distichodus or sixbar distichodus (Distichodus sexfasciatus) is an African species of freshwater fish in the family Distichodontidae.

Description 

The body is high-backed, reddish brown to reddish-yellow colored, with an elongated, partially squat and laterally flattened head and six dark vertical bands. Its snout has a characteristic conical shape. They have 24–25 dorsal soft rays and 14–15 anal soft rays. These fishes feed on worms, crustaceans, insects and plant matter.

Distribution and habitat
This species can be found in Africa, in the basin of the Congo River and in the Lake Tanganyika in the Democratic Republic of the Congo, Central African Republic, Zambia and Angola. These freshwater fish occur in swarms and schools in rivers and lakes, in areas of tropical climate (typically ).

Bibliography 
 Eschmeyer, William N., ed. 1998. Catalog of Fishes. Special Publication of the Center for Biodiversity Research and Information, n. 1, vol. 1–3. California Academy of Sciences. San Francisco, California, United States. 2905. .
 Fenner, Robert M.: The Conscientious Marine Aquarist. Neptune City, New Jersey, United States : T.F.H. Publications, 2001.
 Helfman, G., B. Collette y D. Facey: The diversity of fishes. Blackwell Science, Malden, Massachusetts, United States , 1997.
 Hoese, D.F. 1986: . A M.M. Smith y P.C. Heemstra (eds.) Smiths' sea fishes. Springer-Verlag, Berlin, Germany.
 Maugé, L.A. 1986.  A J. Daget, J.-P. Gosse y D.F.E. Thys van den Audenaerde (ed.) Check-list of the freshwater fishes of Africa (CLOFFA). ISNB, Brussels; MRAC, Tervuren, [ and ORSTOM, Paris, France. Vol. 2.
 Moyle, P. y J. Cech.: Fishes: An Introduction to Ichthyology, 4a. ed., Upper Saddle River, New Jersey, United States: Prentice-Hall. 2000.
 Nelson, J.: Fishes of the World, 3rd. ed. New York, United States: John Wiley and Sons. 1994.
 Wheeler, A.: The World Encyclopedia of Fishes, 2nd. Ed., London: Macdonald. 1985.

References

External links 
   AQUATAB
 Biolib
 Flickr

Distichodus
Taxa named by George Albert Boulenger
Fish described in 1897